Botzum is a Cuyahoga Valley Scenic Railroad train station in Cuyahoga Falls, Ohio, with a street address in Akron, Ohio. It is located adjacent to the Cuyahoga River and Riverview Road in the Cuyahoga Valley National Park.

Initially a stop on the Valley Railway, trains began regular service at Botzum in 1880 — the station was a flag stop.

References

Cuyahoga Valley Scenic Railroad stations
Former Baltimore and Ohio Railroad stations
Former railway stations in Ohio
Railway stations in the United States opened in 1880